Douglas Thomas Lars Murray (born March 12, 1980), nickname "Crankshaft", is a Swedish former professional ice hockey defenceman. He was drafted in the 8th round, 241st overall by the San Jose Sharks in the 1999 NHL Entry Draft. On March 13, 2015, Murray joined the Calgary Flames of the National Hockey League (NHL) on a tryout basis.

Early life
Murray's Swedish mother is a daughter of Lars Björn, an ice hockey defenceman, twice World champion and an Olympic bronze-medalist. His father's ancestors originate from Scotland. While his cousins all have Swedish names, his parents gave their children Scottish or English names. Murray's brothers are named Charles and Ted, with a sister named Roseanna.

Murray attended Portledge School in Locust Valley, New York, for his junior and senior years of high school, and played for the New York Apple Core in nearby Long Beach, before attending Cornell University. He graduated from Cornell in 2003 with a B.S. degree in hotel administration.

Playing career
From 1999–2000 to 2002–03, he played for Cornell University. While at Cornell, he served as captain his senior year and was twice named a first team All-American. He was nominated to the Hobey Baker Memorial Award Final Ten in 2003. In the 2003–04 and the locked-out 2004–05 season he played for San Jose's minor league affiliate, the Cleveland Barons, and contributed both offensively and defensively, leading the team in plus/minus and being second on the team in points for a defenseman. He also served as an alternate captain. He was awarded the Cleveland Barons Rubbermaid "Player of the Year" (along with Josh Gorges) in 2005.

During the 2005–06 NHL season, he was called up to San Jose, due to various injuries plaguing the team's defense. In his short time there that season, he gained praise for his physical presence, as well as solid defense, from such San Jose organization members as TV color commentator Drew Remenda.

Murray renewed his contract with the Sharks in June 2006, signing a three-year-deal worth US$1.65 million. Part of that deal was a $150,000 signing bonus.  In late September 2008, he agreed to a four-year contract extension with the Sharks supposedly worth US$10 million.

His first NHL goal was scored in his 115th career game on February 21, 2008, against Martin Biron of the Philadelphia Flyers.

In the pre-season game of September 26, 2009, Murray performed a hat trick, scoring 3 even strength goals against the Anaheim Ducks, leading to the 6–0 shutout victory, though it was unofficial due to it being in the pre-season. If it had been in the regular season, it would have been his first and only career NHL hat trick.

In 2010, he was chosen as the 16th-smartest athlete in sports by  Sporting News.

On March 25, 2013, the Sharks traded Murray to the Pittsburgh Penguins for Pittsburgh's second round pick in the 2013 draft and a conditional second round pick in 2014. The Sharks later received the conditional pick due to Pittsburgh's progression through two rounds in the 2013 Stanley Cup playoffs.

On August 22, 2013, Murray signed as a free agent to a one-year contract worth $1.5 million with the Montreal Canadiens.

He was not re-signed by the Canadiens at the end of his contract and unable to attract NHL interest, signed a one-year deal with Kölner Haie of the Deutsche Eishockey Liga on January 20, 2015. In the 2014–15 season, Murray was limited to just 8 appearances with the Kölner Haie before suffering injury. On March 13, 2015, Murray returned to North America and signed a professional try-out contract to practice with the Calgary Flames.

Murray announced his retirement on October 21, 2016.

International play
During the 2008 IIHF World Championship, Murray checked Russian player Aleksey Morozov out of the game. Morozov suffered a severe concussion, while Murray received a match penalty.

Murray represented Sweden in the 2010 Winter Olympics in Vancouver.

Personal life

As of the fourth season of the Parneviks reality show in 2018, Douglas was in a relationship with Penny Parnevik (born 1997), daughter of professional golfer Jesper Parnevik. On February 1 2019 the couple were engaged.  Their son, named Atticus, was born in 2019. 

Murray is the co-founder and managing partner of Uber Dispensing Co, which manufactures the UberTap, a hands-free three-spout keg tap invented by Murray and several friends from Cornell. Incidentally, while Murray represented Sweden in ice hockey at the 2010 Vancouver Olympics, another of the company's co-founders, Jamie Moriarty, represented the U.S. in four-man bobsled at the same Olympics. He once rang the bell at the New York Mercantile Exchange in the summer of 2006.

As of April 24 2019 Murray was pursuing several business ventures in Northern California and serving as President and Director of the Sharks Alumni Foundation.

Career statistics

Regular season and playoffs

International

Awards and honors

Records
San Jose Sharks record for hits in a game – 9 (tie) – set April 2, 2011

References

External links

Cornell Big Red profile
 Uber Dispensing Company home page

1980 births
Cleveland Barons (2001–2006) players
Cornell Big Red men's ice hockey players
Djurgårdens IF Hockey players
Ice hockey players at the 2010 Winter Olympics
Kölner Haie players
Living people
Montreal Canadiens players
Olympic ice hockey players of Sweden
Pittsburgh Penguins players
San Jose Sharks draft picks
San Jose Sharks players
Ice hockey people from Stockholm
Swedish expatriate ice hockey players in Germany
Swedish ice hockey defencemen
Swedish people of Scottish descent
Worcester Sharks players
Swedish expatriate ice hockey players in the United States
AHCA Division I men's ice hockey All-Americans
Swedish expatriate ice hockey players in Canada